Walel Watson (born July 17, 1984) is an American mixed martial artist. A professional since 2008, he has fought in the UFC, Titan FC, and Tachi Palace Fights.

MMA career
Watson made his professional debut in 2008 for MMA Xtreme in Mexico at the age of 24. He lost his debut via submission, but went undefeated in his next 7 bouts and never going to the third round.  Prior to joining the UFC, he amassed a record of 8 wins and 2 losses.

Ultimate Fighting Championship
In August 2011, it was announced that Watson signed with the UFC.

Watson's UFC debut took place against Joseph Sandoval on October 1, 2011 at UFC on Versus 6.  He was successful in his debut, winning the fight early via TKO in the first round.

In his second fight, Watson faced Yves Jabouin on December 10, 2011 at UFC 140. After three close rounds Watson lost a controversial split decision.

Watson returned quickly to face T.J. Dillashaw on February 15, 2012 at UFC on Fuel TV 1. He lost the fight via unanimous decision.

Watson was defeated by Mitch Gagnon on September 22, 2012 at UFC 152 via first round rear naked choke.

After posting a 1-3 record inside the promotion, Watson was released from the UFC.

Post-UFC career
A short two months after his UFC release, Watson signed on to face Anthony Moore at Xplode Fight Series: Damage on November 17, 2012. He won the fight via first round TKO. Watson then made a quick turnaround and faced Joey Apodaca at XFS: Vengeance on January 19, 2013. He won the fight via guillotine choke submission, just under twenty-seconds into the first round.

Watson faced Tom Niinimäki at Cage 23 on September 21, 2013. He lost the fight via kimura submission.

He then faced Rodrigo Almeida at CZ 46: Throwdown at The Rock on November 22, 2013. He lost the fight via unanimous decision. In his latest fight, Watson submitted William Joplin at Titan FC 28: Brilz vs. Davis on May 16, 2014.

Watson is expected to face Anthony Gutierrez at Titan FC 30 on September 26, 2014. Watson defeated Gutierrez by Submission in the first round.

On March 20, 2015, he faced Brett Johns for the inaugural Titan FC Bantamweight Championship at Titan FC 33. He lost the fight via submission in the second round.

Watson faced Ricardo Palacios at Golden Boy Promotions' inaugural MMA event on November 24, 2018. He lost the fight via TKO in the first round.

Mixed martial arts record

|-
|
|align=center|
|Serhiy Sidey
|
|BTC 19
|
|align=center|
|align=center|
|Kingston, Canada
|
|-
| Win
| align=center| 15–13
|Marvin Garcia
|Submission (guillotine choke)
|LXF 8: The Return
|
|align=center|1
|align=center|0:53
|Commerce, California, United States
|
|-
| Loss 
| align=center| 14–13
| Kyle Reyes
| Submission (d'arce choke)
| Final Fight Championship 35
| 
| align=center| 1
| align=center| 2:00
| Las Vegas, Nevada, United States
|
|-
| Loss 
| align=center| 14–12
| Ricardo Palacios
| TKO (punch and head kick)
| Golden Boy Promotions: Liddell vs. Ortiz 3
| 
| align=center| 1
| align=center| 3:56
| Inglewood, California, United States
|Catchweight (140 lb) bout.
|-
| Loss 
| align=center| 14–11
| Fard Muhammad	
| Submission (rear-naked choke)
| Smash Global 6
| 
| align=center| 2
| align=center| 3:30
| Los Angeles, California, United States
| 
|-
| Win
| align=center| 14–10
| Miguelito Marti	
| Submission (choke)
| Gladiator Challenge: Fight Fest
| 
| align=center| 1
| align=center| 0:39
| El Cajon, California, United States
| 
|-
| Loss 
| align=center| 13–10
| Felipe Efrain	
| KO (punch to the body)
| Brave Combat Federation - Brave 3: Battle in Brazil
| 
| align=center| 2
| align=center| 2:10
| São José dos Pinhais, Paraná, Brazil
| 
|-
| Loss 
| align=center| 13–9
| Elias Boudegzdame	
| Submission (kimura)
| Brave Combat Federation - Brave 2: Dynasty
| 
| align=center| 1
| align=center| 1:47
| Isa Town, Bahrain
|Featherweight bout.
|-
| Loss 
| align=center| 13–8
| Brett Johns
| Submission (rear-naked choke)
| Titan FC 33
| 
| align=center| 2
| align=center| 3:06
| Mobile, Alabama, United States
| 
|-
| Win
| align=center| 13–7
| Anthony Gutierrez
| Submission (triangle choke)
| Titan FC 30: Brilz vs. Magalhaes
| 
| align=center| 1
| align=center| 3:02
| Cedar Park, Texas, United States
| 
|-
| Win
| align=center| 12–7
| William Joplin
| Submission (rear-naked choke)
|  Titan FC 28: Brilz vs. Davis
| 
| align=center| 3
| align=center| 2:29
| Newkirk, Oklahoma, United States
|Return to Bantamweight.
|-
| Loss 
| align=center| 11–7
| Rodrigo Almeida
| Decision (unanimous)
| CZ 46 - Throwdown at The Rock
| 
| align=center| 3
| align=center| 5:00
| Salem, New Hampshire, United States
|Catchweight (140 lb) bout.
|-
| Loss 
| align=center| 11–6
| Tom Niinimäki
| Submission (kimura)
| Cage 23
| 
| align=center| 2
| align=center| 2:52
| Vantaa, Finland
| 
|-
| Win 
| align=center| 11–5
| Joey Apodaca
| Submission (guillotine choke)
| Xplode Fight Series - Vengeance
| 
| align=center| 1
| align=center| 0:17
| Valley Center, California, United States
| 
|-
| Win 
| align=center| 10–5
| Anthony Moore
| TKO (punches)
| Xplode Fight Series - Damage
| 
| align=center| 1
| align=center| 1:22
| Valley Center, California, United States
| 
|-
| Loss 
| align=center| 9–5
| Mitch Gagnon
| Submission (rear-naked choke)
| UFC 152
| 
| align=center| 1
| align=center| 1:09
| Toronto, Ontario, Canada
| 
|-
| Loss
| align=center| 9–4
| T.J. Dillashaw
| Decision (unanimous)
| UFC on Fuel TV: Sanchez vs. Ellenberger
| 
| align=center| 3
| align=center| 5:00
| Omaha, Nebraska, United States
| 
|-
| Loss
| align=center| 9–3
| Yves Jabouin
| Decision (split)
| UFC 140
| 
| align=center| 3
| align=center| 5:00
| Toronto, Ontario, Canada
| 
|-
| Win
| align=center| 9–2
| Joseph Sandoval
| TKO (punches)
| UFC Live: Cruz vs. Johnson
| 
| align=center| 1
| align=center| 1:17
| Washington, D.C., United States
| 
|-
| Win
| align=center| 8–2
| Ismael Leon
| Submission (anaconda choke)
| Ultimate Warrior Challenge - To The Edge
| 
| align=center| 1
| align=center| 4:58
| Tijuana, Mexico
| 
|-
| Loss
| align=center| 7–2
| Cody Gibson
| TKO (punches & elbows)
| TPF 9: The Contenders
|  
| align=center| 2
| align=center| 4:09
| Lemoore, California, United States
| 
|-
| Win
| align=center| 7–1
| Cristian Jimenez
| Submission (triangle choke)
| Baja Cage Fighting 2 - Bloody X-Mas	
|  
| align=center| 1
| align=center| 4:08
| Tijuana, Mexico
| 
|-
| Win
| align=center| 6–1
| Manuel Gallareta
| Submission (guillotine choke)
| Ultimate Warrior Challenge 8 - Mexican Championships
|  
| align=center| 1
| align=center| 0:43
| Tijuana, Mexico
| 
|-
| Win
| align=center| 5–1
| Joe Gustina
| Submission (anaconda choke)
| Baja Cage Fighting 1 - Return of the Champ
|  
| align=center| 1
| align=center| 3:04
| Tijuana, Mexico
| 
|-
| Win
| align=center| 4–1
| Cristian Jimenez
| Submission (triangle armbar)
| Ultimate Warrior Challenge 7 - Evolution
|  
| align=center| 2
| align=center| 2:26
| Tijuana, Mexico
| 
|-
| Win
| align=center| 3–1
| Gabriel Godinez
| KO (punches)
| Native Fighting Championship 4
|  
| align=center| 1
| align=center| 2:15
| Campo, California, United States
| 
|-
| Win
| align=center| 2–1
| Kisack Monroy
| Submission (guillotine choke)
| Ultimate Warrior Challenge 4 - Rebirth
|  
| align=center| 2
| align=center| 1:33
| Tijuana, Mexico
| 
|-
| Win
| align=center| 1–1
| Peter Martinez
| Submission (rear-naked choke)
| Gladiator Challenge - Never Quit
| 
| align=center| 2
| align=center| 1:33
| San Jacinto, California, United States
| 
|-
| Loss
| align=center| 0–1
| Enrique Cuellar
| Submission (anaconda choke)
| MMA Xtreme 22 - Revolution
|  
| align=center| 1
| align=center| N/A
| Mexico
|

References

External links

1984 births
Living people
American male mixed martial artists
Bantamweight mixed martial artists
Mixed martial artists utilizing Brazilian jiu-jitsu
American practitioners of Brazilian jiu-jitsu
People from El Paso, Texas
Sportspeople from San Diego
Ultimate Fighting Championship male fighters